The Lafayette Residence Park is a national historic district located at Norfolk, Virginia. It encompasses 284 contributing buildings in a primarily residential section and suburban community north of the downtown area of Norfolk. It developed during the first quarter of the 20th century and includes notable examples of the Gothic Revival and Queen Anne styles.  Notable non-residential buildings include the Lafayette Grammar School (1908-1910), Church of the Epiphany (1920), and the First United Methodist Church (1922).

It was listed on the National Register of Historic Places in 1999.

References

Houses on the National Register of Historic Places in Virginia
Historic districts on the National Register of Historic Places in Virginia
National Register of Historic Places in Norfolk, Virginia
Gothic Revival architecture in Virginia
Queen Anne architecture in Virginia
Neighborhoods in Norfolk, Virginia
Houses in Norfolk, Virginia